Sanhe is a town of Chenggu County in southern Shaanxi province, China, located on the southern (right) bank of the Han River and southeast across the river from the county seat. , it has one residential community and seven villages under its administration. Motorists can take China National Highway 316 to access the county seat or G5 Beijing–Kunming Expressway to access locations farther away more quickly.

References

Township-level divisions of Shaanxi
Chenggu County